Vikal is a surname. Notable people with the surname include:

Ankur Vikal, Indian actor
Ram Chandra Vikal (1916–2011), Indian politician